Bukkapatnam Siddharth (born 3 October 1990) is an Indian first-class cricketer who plays for Andhra. He made his first-class debut for Andhra in the 2016-17 Ranji Trophy on 29 November 2016.

References

External links
 

1990 births
Living people
Indian cricketers
Andhra cricketers